Francis John McCaffery (born May 23, 1959) is an American college basketball coach and the current men's basketball head coach at the University of Iowa. He has taken four Division I programs to postseason tournaments, including the Iowa Hawkeyes, who reached the final of the 2013 National Invitation Tournament.

He previously served as head coach of Lehigh University, UNC Greensboro, and Siena.  McCaffery played college basketball for one season at Wake Forest before transferring to Penn.  In his playing days, he acquired the nickname of "White Magic".

He began his college coaching career with a stint at Penn as an assistant coach. McCaffery became an assistant coach at Lehigh in 1983. He was the youngest head coach in Division I when he was promoted to head coach in 1985. Following his career at Lehigh, McCaffery spent 11 years as an assistant at Notre Dame. In 1999, he became the head coach of the UNC Greensboro Spartans. McCaffery had a 90–87 record through six seasons. He led the Spartans to the Southern Conference Championship and the NCAA Tournament in 2001.

In his five seasons at Siena, McCaffery guided the Saints to four 20-win seasons, including three consecutive MAAC Regular-Season and Conference tournament Championships. These resulted in three consecutive berths to the NCAA Tournament, in which they defeated both Vanderbilt and Ohio State in the first rounds. McCaffery's tenure at Siena is considered the greatest in program history as he revived a program that had a record of 6–24 prior to his arrival. He also maintained a 100% graduation rate for players completing their NCAA eligibility. McCaffery was introduced as the head coach of the Iowa Hawkeyes on March 29, 2010.

Head coaching career

Lehigh Mountain Hawks
McCaffery began his tenure at Lehigh University as an assistant coach for two seasons before being promoted at age 26 on September 14, 1985 to succeed Tom Schneider who had resigned to return to Penn in a similar capacity six days prior on September 8. He led Lehigh to a 49–39 record in his three-year term with the Engineers (Lehigh changed their mascot to the Mountain Hawks after McCaffery left). In the 1987–1988 season, McCaffery led Lehigh to its second NCAA Tournament Appearance in program history. He left Lehigh to join Digger Phelps' staff at the University of Notre Dame on August 1, 1988.

UNC Greensboro Spartans

McCaffery posted a 90–87 record in six seasons. In his first year at the helm, Greensboro compiled a 15–13 record overall and a 9-7 Southern Conference mark, good for third place in the North Division. It was the 18th-most improved record nationally among NCAA Division I teams.

In McCaffery's second season, he guided the Spartans to unprecedented heights with a 19–12 record and the 2001 SoCon Tournament Championship. The Spartans defeated Chattanooga, 67–66, in the finals and received the SoCon's automatic bid to the NCAA Tournament. The following year (2001-2002) McCaffery led the Spartans to their first 20-win season since joining the conference. It marked the first time the program claimed a share of the SoCon North Division title as well. After falling to eventual tournament champion Davidson in the conference tournament semifinals, the Spartans were awarded a berth into the 2002 NIT, where they lost to eventual champion Memphis.

In his final year in Greensboro, McCaffery brought the Spartans to the brink of the NCAA Tournament before a SoCon Championship game loss to Chattanooga. He led UNCG to a victory over Davidson in the semifinals, defeating a team that had been 16–0 in conference play. A big part of that success was SoCon Freshman of the Year Kyle Hines. Hines set UNCG and SoCon records for blocked shots, and also broke several other UNCG single-game and freshman single-season marks.

Siena Saints

2005–06
In 2005, the Siena Saints were picked to finish last in preseason polls for the Metro Atlantic Athletic Conference. However, McCaffery orchestrated the fifth greatest turnaround in all of Division 1 and guided Siena to a 15–13 record. The team earned several memorable victories in the regular season, including an 82–74 win against cross-town rival Albany, and an 82–76 triumph at eventual MAAC champion Iona. The Saints clinched a first-round bye in the MAAC tournament with a 98–92 double-overtime victory over Niagara on the team's senior day. Siena's season ended with a 63–62 loss to St. Peter's in the MAAC quarterfinals.

2006–07
McCaffery guided Siena to a 20–12 record in 2007. The Saints began the season with an 11–10 record. However, the team went on a late-season winning streak and won 9 of 10 games. Season highlights included a 76–75 double-overtime victory over rival Albany. Siena was one of the youngest teams in the conference with five underclassmen. The Saints reached the 2007 MAAC championship game and lost to Niagara 83–79.

McCaffery coached three consecutive rookies of the year in their respective leagues. Kyle Hines won the award in the Southern Conference in McCaffery's final year in UNC Greensboro. Kenny Hasbrouck captured the MAAC rookie of the year for the 2005–06 Saints, and Edwin Ubiles shared the award with Canisius' Frank Turner for the 2006–07 season.

2007–08
On November 17, 2007, McCaffery guided Siena to a 79–67 victory over #20 ranked Stanford at the Times Union Center in Albany. The win was Siena's first over a ranked opponent since their first-round victory against the Cardinal in the 1989 NCAA tournament. Siena finished the regular season at 19–10 and 13–5. They tied with Rider for first place in the MAAC. The Saints defeated Manhattan, Loyola and Rider on their way to winning the MAAC championship and an automatic NCAA tournament bid. It was the Siena's fourth trip to the NCAA Tournament and their first under the guidance of McCaffery. In March 2008, the 13th seeded Saints soundly defeated #4 Vanderbilt 83–62 in the first round of the NCAA Tournament in the Midwest Region. Siena's season ended one game short of the sweet sixteen in an 84–72 loss to 12th seeded Villanova. Siena finished the season at 23–11. It was the most wins for a Siena team since the 1999–2000 season.

2008–09
Siena was ranked highly in preseason publications entering the 2008–09 season. The Saints convincingly won their first two games against Boise State and Cornell. McCaffery guided Siena to victories in 25 of their final 30 games. Siena won games against St. Joe's, Northern Iowa, Albany and Buffalo along the way. Siena's 16 MAAC wins tied a league record for regular season wins. Siena would go on to win the MAAC championship (and clinch a second straight NCAA tournament bid) by defeating Canisius, Fairfield and Niagara. McCaffery led the Saints to the most single season wins in their Division I history and earned the 2009 MAAC coach of the year.

In the first round of the NCAA Tournament, Siena defeated Ohio State 74–72 in double overtime to reach the round of 32 for the second straight season. The Saints led #1 ranked Louisville 63–59 midway into the 2nd half before losing 79–72 to end their season at 27–8. Siena finished ranked 28th in the final ESPN/USA Today coaches poll, the school's highest ranking.

2009–10
Siena entered the 2009–10 with the highest expectations in program history. After a slow start, the Saints won 15 straight games and 21 of 23 games to capture the school's third consecutive MAAC tournament championship, defeating Fairfield in overtime 72–65. Siena lost to Purdue 72–64 in the first round of the NCAA tournament to end their season at 27–7. McCaffery was also honored by the national coaches' association as an all-district coach.

Iowa Hawkeyes

2010–11

McCaffery was hired by the University of Iowa on March 28, 2010, to replace Todd Lickliter. He was introduced during a press conference and a public ceremony in Carver-Hawkeye Arena on March 29, 2010.

McCaffery lost his first game as head coach at Iowa on November 16, 2010, when the Hawkeyes lost to South Dakota State. His first conference win with the Hawkeyes came against Indiana in Iowa City on January 23. His first win versus a ranked team as the head coach of Iowa came on March 5, when Iowa defeated No. 6 Purdue, 67–65. That win snapped a 25-game losing streak against ranked opponents for the Hawkeyes.

2011–12
McCaffery led the Iowa Hawkeyes to 4 wins over ranked opponents – twice against Wisconsin, once against Michigan, and once against Indiana. The Hawkeyes won 3 conference road games in a season for the first time since 2006. For the second consecutive season, attendance increased at Iowa home basketball games. 
 
Iowa beat Illinois in the first round of the Big Ten tournament.  The Hawkeyes then lost to eventual tournament champion Michigan State. At 17–16, Iowa earned a bid to the NIT postseason tournament. The Hawkeyes were seeded seventh in their region, but due to a scheduling conflict, they hosted the second seeded Dayton Flyers. Iowa won the contest 84–75, the first postseason win for Iowa since 2004. The NIT bid showed the enthusiasm building around the program, over 13,000 tickets were sold in under twenty-four hours.

During the offseason excitement built about the incoming recruiting class, one of the best in the conference. Iowa native and a member of the Wisconsin Badger Basketball team, Jarrod Uthoff transferred to Iowa. Also during the offseason, McCaffery signed a 7-year contract extension, worth $1.66 million per season.

2012–13
Iowa finished the non-conference schedule with an 11–2 record, including wins over in-state rivals Iowa State and UNI. It was the best non-conference record since the 2004–2005 season, and the best by a McCaffery team at Iowa. Iowa finished the regular season with a 20–11 record including 9–9 in conference play, resulting in an NIT bid. Iowa ended up as the NIT runners-up. McCaffery also picked up his 300th career win as a head coach on March 9 when Iowa beat Nebraska 74–60.

2013–14
Iowa finished the non-conference season with a record of 11–2.  The two non-conference losses were to Villanova (88–83 in overtime, in the Battle for Atlantic Title Game) and in-state rival Iowa State (85–82).  McCaffery then led his Hawkeyes to a Big Ten record of 9–9 with quality wins at #3 Ohio State (84–74) and at home versus Michigan (85–67).  Iowa received the sixth seed in the Big Ten tournament.  After beating Northwestern two times during the regular season, Iowa lost to Northwestern (67–62) in the first round of the Big Ten tournament.  On Selection Sunday, McCaffery's team was put as the 11th seed having to play a play-in game versus Tennessee.  Fran's son was diagnosed with a thyroid tumor in his neck, which eventually became cancer towards the end of the regular season.  McCaffery flew home from the play-in game for his son's surgery then flew back to Dayton, Ohio to coach his team to a heartbreaking loss (78–65).  The Iowa Hawkeyes ended the season with a record of 20–13.

2014–15
Before the season began, Fran McCaffery received a contract extension through the 2019–2020 season.

The Hawkeyes finished their non-conference schedule 9–4, with losses to #10 Texas (71–57) and #23 Syracuse (66–63) in the 2K Classic. Additional non-conference losses came at the hands of rivals #14 Iowa State (90–75) and UNI (56–44). McCaffery lead Iowa to a 12–6 record in the Big Ten, including memorable wins over #20 Ohio State (71–65) and #17 Maryland (71–55). McCaffrey's Hawkeyes were upset in the second round of the Big Ten tournament by Penn State (67–58), but still finished tied for third in the conference. Iowa earned a 7th seed in the NCAA tournament and beat Davidson (83–52) in the Round of 64 before bowing out to Gonzaga (87–68) in the third round. McCaffery's Hawkeyes finished 22–12 on the year.

2015–16
Iowa finished their non-conference schedule 9–3, with losses to Dayton (82-77), #17 Notre Dame (68-62), and rivals #4 Iowa State (83-82). Coach McCaffery opened Big Ten play with a victory over #1 Michigan State (83-70). The Hawkeyes finished conference play 12-6 for the second straight season, with two wins over ranked Purdue, two wins over Michigan, and a second win over Michigan State, this time ranked #4, 76–59. McCaffrey's Hawkeyes lost to Illinois (68-66) in the first round of the Big Ten tournament, but finished tied for third in the conference for the second straight year. Iowa earned a 7th seed in the NCAA tournament, also for the second straight year, and beat Temple (72-70) in the Round of 64. The Hawkeyes lost in the third round of the tournament for the second year in a row, this time to eventual champion Villanova (87–68). In a year where history seemed to repeat itself, McCaffery's Hawkeyes again won 22 games en route to a 22–11 season.

2016–17
After the 2015–16 season graduated 4 senior starters Iowa got off to a rocky start to the 2016-17 campaign, going 3–5 with losses to Seton Hall (91-83), Virginia (74-41), Memphis (100-92), Notre Dame (92-78), and Nebraska-Omaha (98-89). The Hawkeyes turned things around in December and ended non-conference play with five straight victories, including wins over in-state rivals #25 Iowa State (78-64) and UNI (69-46). Iowa finished non-conference play 8–5 on the year. The Hawkeyes went 10–8 in conference play, with wins over Michigan (86-83), #17 Purdue (83-78), Ohio State (85-72), #24 Maryland (83-69), Indiana (96-90), and #22 Wisconsin (59-57). McCaffery's Hawkeyes were invited to the NIT post-season tournament and defeated South Dakota (87-75) before losing in overtime to eventual champion TCU (94-92), finishing their season 19–15. Senior Peter Jok lead the Big Ten in scoring (19.9 ppg) and was first-team all-conference.

2017–18
The 2017–18 season was a disaster for the Hawkeyes. After losing the Big Ten leading scorer, Peter Jok, a young Iowa team struggled to find their identity. Coach McCaffery's eldest son, Connor, joined the team as an ESPN four-star recruit out of local Iowa City West, but battled a series of ailments, including mononucleosis, which lead to being granted a medical redshirt year. Iowa finished the season 14–19, 4–14 in Big Ten play in a three-way tie for 11th place. As the No. 12 seed in the Big Ten tournament, they defeated Illinois before losing to Michigan in the second round.

2018–19
A young Iowa team won the 2K Sports Classic early in the season, defeating #13 Oregon (77-69) and UCONN (91-72) in back-to-back nights at Madison Square Garden. The Hawkeyes would go undefeated in non-conference play, with wins over in-state rivals Iowa State (98-84) and UNI (77-54). They also scored a whopping 68 points in the first half of a 105–78 win over Alabama State and beat Savannah State by 46 (110-64). Iowa's season featured several thrilling contests, including a 1-point victory over Pitt (69-68), and buzzer-beating wins in back-to-back games against Northwestern (80-79) and Rutgers (71-69). Iowa just missed a chance to make it three last-second victories in a row, but a shot as time expired rimmed out against #24 Maryland (66-65). Other notable regular season victories for Iowa included wins over #24 Nebraska (93-84), #16 Ohio State (72-62), and #5 Michigan (74-59). The Hawkeyes ended the regular season on a 4-game losing streak. In the Big Ten tournament, Iowa defeated Illinois before falling to Michigan. The Hawkeyes earned the No. 10 seed in the South Regional in the NCAA Tournament. In the first round, the Hawkeyes came from behind to upset seventh-seed Cincinnati (79-72). Then, Iowa faced off against second seed Tennessee in the Round of 32. The Hawkeyes came back from a 25-point deficit in the first half to send the game to overtime, which was won by Tennessee.

2019–20
The 2019-20 season saw Iowa complete a 9-2 non-conference schedule with notable wins over rival Iowa State (84-68), and #12 ranked Texas Tech (72-61). The Iowa squad was led by standout center Luka Garza, who averaged 23.9 points and 9.8 rebounds en route to numerous accolades. Garza would go on to win the Big Ten Player of the Year, Sporting News Men's College Basketball Player of the Year, Pete Newell Big Man Award, Kareem Abdul-Jabbar Award, and consensus All-American honors while leading the Hawkeyes to a 20-11 record that featured conference wins over #12 Maryland (67-49), #19 Michigan (90-83), #24 Rutgers (85-80), #19 Illinois (72-65), #25 Ohio State (85-76), and #16 Penn State (77-68). The 2019-20 season ended abruptly with the outbreak of the COVID-19 coronavirus without a postseason being played. McCaffery's younger son, Patrick, another ESPN four-star recruit, joined the team as a freshman but took a medical redshirt while recovering from the residual effects thyroid cancer treatment.

2020-21
The start of the 2020-21 basketball season saw McCaffery's Hawkeyes as the #5 ranked team in AP pre-season poll. The team returned every starter from a squad that finished 20-11 in a COVID-shortened 2019-20 season, including Naismith Player of the Year favorite Luka Garza. Garza would go on to win his second consecutive Big Ten Player of the Year, while also being named a consensus All-American for the second time.  Iowa earned a 2 seed in the NCAA Tournament which is tied for best in school history.

Head coaching record

Accomplishments 
 BCANY (Basketball Coaches Association of New York) Coach of the Year sponsored by New Balance for 2008–09 season.
 2001 Southern Conference Tournament Championship
 2008, 2009 and 2010 MAAC Tournament Championships
 2008, 2009 and 2010 MAAC Regular Season Championships
 2008 and 2009 NCAA tournament first round wins
 2013 NIT Runner-Up
 2014 NCAA tournament
 2015 NCAA tournament
 2016 NCAA tournament
 2018 2K Classic Champion
 2019 NCAA tournament
 2021 NCAA tournament
 2022 Big Ten tournament championship
 2022 NCAA tournament

Personal life
Growing up in the Philadelphia suburbs, McCaffery attended Ancillae-Assumpta Academy ('73) and LaSalle College High School ('77). He and his wife Margaret have four children: sons Connor, Patrick, and Jonathan, and a daughter, Marit. McCaffery is actively involved with Coaches vs. Cancer in the Capital Region. The McCafferys are also involved with the Johnson County (Iowa City) Relay For Life. His brother Jack is a sports columnist for the Delaware County (Pa.) Daily Times.

McCaffery's wife, Margaret, was a standout women's basketball player from Saint Paul, Minnesota. She had an outstanding college career playing at the University of Notre Dame.

In 2014 McCaffery's son, Patrick, was taken to the University of Iowa hospitals to have a thyroid tumor removed. After testing the tumor was found to be cancerous. Patrick was 14 at the time, but went on to become the all-time leading scorer in basketball at West High School in Iowa City. 

McCaffery's son, Connor, currently plays for his father at Iowa. He was considered to be a top 100 recruit in the country. Connor also plays baseball for the Iowa Hawkeyes baseball team.

In 2018, Patrick McCaffery joined his brother Connor by committing to Iowa. He was considered a top 100 recruit for the class of 2019.

References

External links
 Iowa profile
 Siena profile

1959 births
Living people
American men's basketball coaches
American men's basketball players
Basketball coaches from Pennsylvania
Basketball players from Philadelphia
College men's basketball head coaches in the United States
Educators from Pennsylvania
Iowa Hawkeyes men's basketball coaches
Lehigh Mountain Hawks men's basketball coaches
Notre Dame Fighting Irish men's basketball coaches
Penn Quakers men's basketball coaches
Penn Quakers men's basketball players
Point guards
Siena Saints men's basketball coaches
UNC Greensboro Spartans men's basketball coaches
Wake Forest Demon Deacons men's basketball players